"Profile in Silver" is the first segment of the twentieth episode of the first season (1985–86) of the television series The Twilight Zone. In this segment, a time traveler interferes in the assassination of John F. Kennedy, and must find a way to repair the resulting damage to the timeline.

Plot
Dr. Joseph Fitzgerald has traveled back in time from the year 2172 and assumed the identity of an instructor at Harvard University. His mission is to video record the assassination of John F. Kennedy, from whom he is descended. Fitzgerald is nervous about watching his own ancestor be murdered. Dr. Kate Wang, a colleague from his own time, rebukes him for carrying around a 1964 coin with Kennedy's image, but he implores her to let this minor infraction against time travel rules slide.

At the scene of the assassination, Fitzgerald impulsively shouts for the president to take cover. President Kennedy ducks, and the shot misses him. A grateful Kennedy invites Fitzgerald to stay at the White House. As Kennedy and his entourage return home, the president is notified that Nikita Khrushchev has been assassinated and Soviet troops have captured West Berlin.

Fitzgerald consults his wrist computer, which informs him that his alteration of history has caused massive rips in the fabric of time. The assassination of Khrushchev was not enough to fix the damage; all possible outcomes to this timeline involve war between the superpowers. The only way to repair the timeline is for Kennedy to die in the exact manner as history recorded.

The president's Secret Service bodyguard, Ray, has grown suspicious of Fitzgerald after finding his 1964 coin and examining his video camera, the shell of which is an unknown alloy that cannot be opened. Kennedy summons Fitzgerald, who tells them the whole story, showing a holographic display from the camera as partial proof. Kennedy volunteers to go back and be assassinated in order to repair the timeline. Fitzgerald, overwhelmed by his ancestor's heroism, removes his Harvard school ring, which is actually his time travel device, and places it on Kennedy's hand. Kennedy is transported to Fitzgerald's home, in 2172. Fitzgerald takes Kennedy's place in the Dallas motorcade.

At Parkland Memorial Hospital in Dallas, the dead body of "President Kennedy" (actually Fitzgerald) is attended to by Dr. Wang. Ray recognizes her ring because it is identical to Fitzgerald's. She tells him she knew what Fitzgerald's fate would be, since even actions committed during time travel become part of history, but could not let him know.

At Harvard University in 2172, John F. Kennedy delivers a speech to a classroom full of students, in which he implicitly lauds Fitzgerald's sacrifice and the sacrifices of other honorable men like him.

Response
Starloggers.com ranks it as number two on its top 10 Twilight Zone episodes from the 1980s.

See also
Assassination of John F. Kennedy in popular culture
 11/22/63

References

External links
 
 Postcards From The Zone episode 1.49 Profile in Silver
 Profile in Silver and Other Screenwritings
 Profile in Silver: An Introduction
 Profile in Silver: Script First Draft
 Back to Dealey Plaza
 "Profile in Silver" Announced as 2014 Feature Film

1986 American television episodes
The Twilight Zone (1985 TV series season 1) episodes
Works about the assassination of John F. Kennedy
Fiction set in 1963
Fiction set in the 22nd century
Television episodes about time travel
Cultural depictions of John F. Kennedy
Cultural depictions of Lee Harvey Oswald
World War III speculative fiction

fr:Telle était ma destinée
Alternate history works